Aambaliyasan is a census town in Mehsana district in the Indian state of  Gujarat.

Demographics
 India census, Aambaliyasan had a population of 6736. Males constitute 54% of the population and females 46%. Aambaliyasan has an average literacy rate of 66%, higher than the national average of 59.5%; with 61% of the males and 39% of females literate. 15% of the population is under 6 years of age.

References

Cities and towns in Mehsana district
Villages in Mehsana district